Angelica tomentosa is a species of angelica known as woolly angelica. It is native to the coastal mountain ranges of California and southern Oregon, where it grows in wooded areas. This is a taprooted perennial herb producing an erect, hollow stem to heights generally between 1 and 2 meters. The leaves may be nearly a meter long but are actually made up of many leaflike leaflets, each up to 12 centimeters long and lance-shaped to oval and sometimes toothed. The inflorescence is a compound umbel of up to 60 long rays each bearing clusters of whitish or yellowish flowers.

External links
Jepson Manual Treatment
USDA Plants Profile
Photo gallery

Flora of California
Flora of Oregon
tomentosa
Plants described in 1876
Flora without expected TNC conservation status